The Delaware Black Caucus, also known as the DBC, is a non-partisan American public policy, research and educational organization. The DBC is composed of African Americans elected as mayors, council members in the state of Delaware, as well as members of the Delaware General Assembly.

Priorities
The mission of the DBC is to serve as a non-partisan policy-oriented catalyst that educates future leaders and promotes collaboration among legislators, business leaders, minority-focused organizational leaders, and organized labor to effect positive and sustainable change in the African American community. The DBC works to broaden and elevate the influence of African Americans in the political, legislative, and public policy arenas in Delaware.  The DBC creates, identifies, analyzes and disseminates policy-oriented information critical to advancing African Americans and people of African descent towards equity in economics, health and education.

History

Current membership
List of officers:

Members
James Baker, Mayor, City of Wilmington
Donald Blakey, Delaware State Rep. (R-Dover)
Theodore "Ted" Blunt, Ex-President, Wilmington City Council
Michael Brown, Wilmington City Council
Margaret Rose Henry, Delaware State Sen. (D-Wilmington)
Robin Fisher, Laurel Town Council
Theopalis Gregory, Wilmington City Council
J.J. Johnson, Delaware State Rep. (D-New Castle)
Pat A. Jones, Seaford City Council
Robert McGhee, Middletown Town Council
Charles Potter, Wilmington City Council
Sophia Russell, Dover City Council
Reuben Salters, Dover City Council
Hanifa Shabazz, Wilmington City Council
Dennis Williams, Delaware State Rep. (D-Wilmington)
Katrina Wilson, Milford City Council

Notes

African Americans in Delaware
Specific
State Legislative Black Caucuses